Boy of Mine is a 1923 American silent family drama film directed by William Beaudine that was based upon a short story by Booth Tarkington. It stars Ben Alexander, Rockliffe Fellowes, and Henry B. Walthall. Wendy L. Marshall stated that "Beaudine had the Midas touch when it came to directing children" in films like this and Penrod and Sam.

Plot
As described in a film magazine review, young Bill Latimer is wrecking his father's nerves with his boyish pranks. The father does not rightly understand the lad, and, when he punishes him for his unwitting disobedience, Bill runs away. He is brought back home by Dr. Robert Mason, who saves Bill from some kidnappers. Bill's mother leaves the home with her son. This separation makes the father realizes his mistakes, leading to a resolution for the whole family.

Cast

References

External links

Lobby card at www.alamy.com

1923 films
1923 drama films
American silent feature films
American children's drama films
American black-and-white films
Films directed by William Beaudine
Films based on works by Booth Tarkington
First National Pictures films
1920s American films
Silent American drama films
1920s English-language films